The Arthur Murray Party is an American television variety show which ran from July 1950 until September 1960. The show was hosted by famous dancers Arthur and Kathryn Murray, and was basically one long advertisement for their chain of dance studios. Each week the couple performed a mystery dance, and the viewer who correctly identified the dance would receive two free lessons at a local studio.

The Arthur Murray Party is notable for being one of the few TV series—the others were Down You Go, The Ernie Kovacs Show, Pantomime Quiz, The Original Amateur Hour, and Tom Corbett, Space Cadet—broadcast on all four major commercial networks in the 1950s during the Golden Age of Television. It may, in fact, be the only series which had a run on all four networks at least twice.

Overview
The show was set up like a large party, with Kathryn hosting a variety of guests, from sports stars to actors or musicians. Murray dance studio instructors would help Kathryn and Arthur to show their guests how to perform a particular dance step. At the end of the show, the couple would perform a Johann Strauss waltz.

The dancers often dressed in elegant clothing, which could cause amusing problems at times. In one surviving episode (February 15, 1954), available on Internet Archive, the well-dressed female dancers are heard squealing with teenage-like excitement at guest star Johnnie Ray. Buddy Holly and The Crickets performed "Peggy Sue" on the December 29, 1957 telecast, also preserved on a kinescope.

The J. Fred and Leslie W. MacDonald Collection at the Library of Congress contains thirteen kinescoped programs and partial programs of the various incarnations of Arthur Murray on TV. These include a complete one-hour show from late 1950 featuring guests The DeMarco Sisters plus Andy and Della Russell; a complete half-hour show from August 17, 1954, featuring guest Don Cornell; a segment from September 27, 1956, in which The Platters perform "You'll Never Know" and Andy Williams sings "Canadian Sunset"; and a segment from August 5, 1957, in which celebrities Jack E. Leonard, Bert Lahr, Paul Winchell, and June Havoc compete in a dance contest.

Broadcast history
The show appeared on ABC for the first few months of its broadcast as Arthur Murray Party Time, then moved to the DuMont, ABC, CBS, DuMont, CBS, NBC, CBS, and finally NBC (in that order).

The time slots for Season One are as follows:

July 1950 – Sept 1950 Thursdays 9:00–9:30pm ET (ABC)
Oct 1950 – Jan 1951 Sundays 9:00–10:00pm ET (DuMont)
Jan 1951 – March 1951 Sundays 9:00–9:30pm ET (DuMont)
Apr 1951 – June 1951 Mondays 9:00–9:30pm ET (ABC)

When the series first moved to DuMont in the fall of 1950, its title was changed to The Arthur Murray Show, which it retained for over a year-and-a-half, before adapting the more familiar Arthur Murray Party moniker in the summer of 1952.

See also
List of programs broadcast by the DuMont Television Network
List of surviving DuMont Television Network broadcasts
1950-51 United States network television schedule (ABC/DuMont, see "Broadcast History" section, 30 minutes and 60 minutes)
1951-52 United States network television schedule (ABC, Wednesdays at 9:15pm ET, 15 minutes)
1952-53 United States network television schedule (DuMont, Sundays at 10pm ET, 30 minutes)
1953-54 United States network television schedule (NBC, Mondays at 7:30pm ET, 15 minutes)
1954-55 United States network television schedule
1955-56 United States network television schedule
1956-57 United States network television schedule
1957-58 United States network television schedule
1958-59 United States network television schedule (NBC, Mondays at 10pm ET, 30 minutes)
1959-60 United States network television schedule (NBC, Tuesdays at 9pm ET, 30 minutes)

Note: The Arthur Murray Party aired outside of prime time in certain TV seasons.

References

Bibliography
David Weinstein, The Forgotten Network: DuMont and the Birth of American Television (Philadelphia: Temple University Press, 2004) 
Alex McNeil, Total Television, Fourth edition (New York: Penguin Books, 1980) 
Tim Brooks and Earle Marsh, The Complete Directory to Prime Time Network TV Shows, Third edition (New York: Ballantine Books, 1964)

External links 
 
 List of Season 1 episodes (ABC/DuMont) at CTVA
 DuMont historical website
 
 Second half of 60-minute DuMont show with Reginald Gardiner and Lily Ann Carol (October 22, 1950) at Internet Archive

1950 American television series debuts
1960 American television series endings
American Broadcasting Company original programming
Black-and-white American television shows
CBS original programming
Dance television shows
DuMont Television Network original programming
English-language television shows
NBC original programming